HMS Humber was an 80-gun third rate ship of the line of the Royal Navy, launched at Hull on 30 March 1693.

She was rebuilt according to the 1706 Establishment at Deptford in 1708. Her guns, previously being mounted on two gundecks, were now mounted on three, though she remained classified as a third rate. On 30 October 1723 Humber was ordered to be taken to pieces and rebuilt to the 1719 Establishment at Portsmouth. She was renamed HMS Princess Amelia, and relaunched on 4 October 1726.

Princess Amelia was broken up in 1752.

Notes

References

Lavery, Brian (2003) The Ship of the Line - Volume 1: The development of the battlefleet 1650-1850. Conway Maritime Press. .

Ships of the line of the Royal Navy
1690s ships